Stanisław Krusiński (1 May 1857, Posiołkach, Saratov Governorate – 24 January 1886, Kazan) was a Polish economist, sociologist and political activist. One of the first Polish Marxists. With his colleagues (such as Ludwik Krzywicki), he translated Karl Marx's Capital into Polish.

References

1857 births
1886 deaths
Marxian economists
Polish economists
Polish Marxists
Polish sociologists